Rannell Hall (born January 30, 1993) is an American football wide receiver and cornerback for the Arlington Renegades of the XFL. He played college football at UCF.

Professional career

Tampa Bay Buccaneers
Hall signed with the Tampa Bay Buccaneers as an undrafted free agent on May 5, 2015. He was waived on September 6, 2015 and signed to the practice squad.

Cleveland Browns
Hall signed with the Cleveland Browns off the Buccaneers' practice squad on December 14, 2015. He suffered a broken fibula before the season started and did not play at all in 2016. On February 10, 2017, the Browns re-signed Hall.

On September 2, 2017, Hall was waived by the Browns. He was re-signed to the practice squad on October 3, 2017. He was released on December 5, 2017.

Atlanta Falcons
On January 2, 2018, Hall was signed to the Atlanta Falcons' practice squad.

Orlando Apollos
In 2018, Hall signed with the Orlando Apollos for the 2019 season.

Winnipeg Blue Bombers
After the AAF ceased operations in April 2019, Hall signed with the Winnipeg Blue Bombers of the Canadian Football League on May 26, 2019. He was released on May 28.

Massachusetts Pirates
Hall played briefly for the Massachusetts Pirates of the National Arena League during the 2019 season. Hall appeared in 1 game while recording 8 receptions for 98 yards and 2 touchdowns.

Tampa Bay Vipers
In October 2019, Hall was selected by the Tampa Bay Vipers in the 2020 XFL Draft. He was placed on injured reserve on February 24, 2020. He had his contract terminated when the league suspended operations on April 10, 2020.

Tampa Bay Bandits
In March 2022, Hall was selected by the Tampa Bay Bandits in the seventh round of the 2022 USFL Supplemental Draft. After suffering a thigh injury, he was transferred to the team's practice squad before the start of the regular season on April 16, 2022, and remained on the inactive roster on April 22 with a thigh injury. He was transferred to the active roster on April 30. He was released after the season on January 2, 2023, after the team became the Memphis Showboats.

Arlington Renegades
Hall was placed on the reserve list by the Arlington Renegades of the XFL on February 22, 2023. He was activated on March 17.

References

External links

Cleveland Browns bio
Tampa Bay Buccaneers bio 
UCF Knights bio

Living people
1993 births
Players of American football from Miami
Miami Carol City Senior High School alumni
American football wide receivers
UCF Knights football players
Tampa Bay Buccaneers players
Cleveland Browns players
Atlanta Falcons players
Orlando Apollos players
Winnipeg Blue Bombers players
Tampa Bay Vipers players
Players of Canadian football from Miami
Massachusetts Pirates players
Tampa Bay Bandits (2022) players
Arlington Renegades players